Meisho Samson (Japanese : メイショウサムソン, March 7, 2003 - ) is a Japanese racehorse which won the Tokyo Yūshun and Satsuki Sho in 2006, and the Tenno Sho (Spring and Autumn) in 2007.

Stud career
Meisho Samson's descendants include:

c = colt, f = filly

Pedigree

References

2003 racehorse births
Racehorses bred in Japan
Racehorses trained in Japan
Thoroughbred family 3-l